Shion Miyawaki (宮脇詩音) is a Japanese pop singer under the label Rhythm Zone along with fellow rival, classmate and friend Seara Kojo.

Biography
At the age of 12, Shion was selected to go to the Avex Artist Academy. After 4 years of long-term lessons, she graduated with classmate Seara Kojo.

They were signed under the label Rhythm Zone and became the project The Rival. They both released a single, Shions was called BOY and Searas was called JOY. Both leading songs had the same melody, only a different arrangement. Both singles were released on the same day but failed reaching the top 100 on the Oricon chart.

After their first single they both released a 1000 copied limited single. The one selling her copies the fastest would be the first one re-signed on their label and would be the first one to release new material.
Shion won this competition selling her single Shinin' Star a couple of weeks before Seara and so she started recording her mini-debut album Dear.
Because they both out sold their single they got their own Official websites.

Shion now writes a cellphone story named KoiUta. This is a story about Shions experience with love. On 21 April 2009, Shions official website presented a new arranged version of Shinin' Star that would be available for online download on mu-mo. On 17 June the official website released a new song named Everything is you -MAKAI original mix- for the cellphone.
CD Japan listed a new mini-album from Shion Miyawaki named Love Songs – Koi Uta to be released on 2 September. On 17 July 2009, the second mini-album was confirmed Shions official website. The mini-album contained songs in which she sang about her experience that were told in KoiUta.

In year 2016, her songs 'Kaketa Tsuki' and 'Mata Kimi ni Aeru Hi' are used as the Assassination Classroom: Second Season first and second ending songs respectively.

Discography

Mini albums

Full albums

Singles

Singles (Digital Download)

Collaborations
2008 October 8 ICE×SHION×nawii  – Beat☆Bang!!Bang!!

Television work
Shion Miyawaki is one of the main cast members of  MTV Asia's reality television series, Shibuhara Girls.

References

External links
 
Official Blog 
The Rival.net 

Japanese women pop singers
1990 births
Living people
21st-century Japanese singers
21st-century Japanese women singers